First Strike is a 1979 film created by KRON-TV and Chronicle Publishing Company under the broadcast division name "Chronicle Broadcasting Company" in partnership with the United States Department of Defense and the RAND Corporation. The film discusses the United States Armed Forces strategy for dealing with nuclear warfare and became far better known when various clips were edited into the 1983 TV film The Day After.

Plot
The film is divided into two main segments. The first section of the film is a dramatization of a sneak attack by Soviet Union nuclear weapons against the United States. The premise of the attack is based on Soviet nuclear submarines approaching the United States West Coast and launching a barrage of missiles at ICBM silos and B-52 bomber bases, and other Soviet forces manage to destroy a number of U.S. ballistic missile submarines at sea. In the film, when Strategic Air Command is able to launch a retaliatory strike, over 80% of U.S. strategic forces have been destroyed, and the President of the United States is forced to surrender to the Soviets under threat of U.S. urban centers being destroyed. U.S. casualties are stated to be eight million dead; the "low" number is because of the Soviet attack hitting military bases, instead of cities.

The second portion of the film is a series of interviews in which analysts discuss U.S. security and the ability of the Soviet military to attack with little to no warning. The interviewees mention and advocate the MX missile system, which was in the 1980s fielded as the LGM-118 Peacekeeper. However, not all aspects of the MX system were implemented.

Plausibility
Since its original release, the scenario in the film has come to be seen as extremely unrealistic by some military theorists. The main flaw in the documentary has been stated that the Soviet Navy would not have been able to deploy its submarine fleet and approach the United States coast undetected since Soviet submarine technology of the 1970s could not have breached U.S. sonar detection. Furthermore, the president is depicted surrendering very quickly, but realistically, any attack on America would have unleashed a swift response by the entire armed forces of NATO in Europe under Article 5 of the North Atlantic Treaty. Also, British and French nuclear forces; those possessed by Belgium, Italy, Greece, Canada and West Germany as part of the NATO nuclear sharing; and the likelihood of China siding with NATO and attacking the Soviet Union's southern border are not considered.

Depiction in The Day After
Four years after its release, significant scenes of the film were incorporated into the TV movie The Day After to depict an American nuclear attack:

The SAC Airborne Command Center general boarding his command plane and receiving a morning briefing
An ICBM crew arriving at a missile command center for a shift change
B-52 bomber forces being placed on alert
A scene in the SAC command plane in which the general in command, along with an aide, opens the nuclear missile launch code safe
A Minuteman Missile crew launching its nuclear missiles
Beale Air Force Base radar stations detecting inbound Soviet missiles
Command plane reporting that over 300 Soviet ICBMs are inbound

Air Force personnel
The film used actual United States Air Force personnel for actors and filmed on location at various Air Force installations. Specifically, the film used cameras on-board Strategic Air Command command planes out of Offutt Air Force Base and also shot footage inside NORAD.

The nuclear missile launch sequence seen in the film and later in The Day After was performed by actual Air Force officers stationed with the 742d Missile Squadron at Minot Air Force Base.  The alert launch of B-52 bombers was performed by the 2d Bombardment Squadron, 22nd Bombardment Wing, Select crew S-32, consisting of Aircraft Commander/pilot - Capt Mike Wise, co-pilot - Capt Kevin Schmidt, radar navigator - Capt Harry Mandros, navigator - 1Lt Bill Pfeiffer, electronic warfare officer - 1Lt Kent Esbenshade, and tail gunner - TSgt Michael Reed, at March Air Force Base, California. An additional scene provided by the United States Navy depicts the USS Francis Scott Key getting underway for a patrol.

None of the Air Force personnel was credited in the film, but the ICBM launch crew has visible name tags as "Lieutenant Krause" and "Captain Stanton." In the film The Day After, the missile launch sequence begins with Lieutenant Krause quickly hanging up a phone and saying, "I gotta go."  First Strike shows the first half of the conversation in which Krause is on a date with a girl and invites her to a party at La Hacienda, a popular steakhouse near Minot. The original footage also shows both men being killed by a direct nuclear strike on their underground launch capsule.

The Air Force general in command of the "Looking Glass" EC-135 plane was real-life Brigadier General Clarence R. Autery.

References

External links 
 
 First Strike at YouTube

Films about the United States Air Force